The 2020 edition of the Canadian Polaris Music Prize was presented on October 19, 2020. The longlist was announced on June 15, 2020, with the shortlist following on July 15, 2020 and the winner announced on October 19, 2020. Due to the COVID-19 pandemic, the traditional winner's gala did not take place this year, and instead a special cinematic tribute to the shortlist was streamed online by CBC Music and CBC Gem, following which the winner was announced.   

The award was won by Backxwash for the album God Has Nothing to Do With This Leave Him Out of It.

The livestreamed presentation received a Canadian Screen Award nomination for Best Live Production for Social Media at the 9th Canadian Screen Awards.

Shortlist 
The shortlist was announced July 15, 2020 in a radio special on CBC Music hosted by Angeline Tetteh-Wayoe. Three of the shortlisted artists (Caribou, Kaytranada, and Lido Pimienta) have won a previous Polaris Music Prize, with two (Jessie Reyez and U.S. Girls) having previously been shortlisted.

Longlist 
The longlist consists of 40 albums, chosen by a panel of 199 Canadian jurors. Eligible albums must have been released between June 1, 2019, and May 31, 2020, although albums from May 2019 were considered if they didn't make the 2019 longlist.

Polaris Heritage Prize
Nominees for the Slaight Family Polaris Heritage Prize, an award to honour classic Canadian albums released before the creation of the Polaris Prize, were announced on October 22. The winners of the public and jury votes were announced on November 16.

References 

2020 in Canadian music
2020 music awards
2020